The 2017 Six Nations Under 20s Championship, was the 10th series of the Six Nations Under 20s Championship, the annual northern hemisphere rugby union championship. Wales were the defending champions. The competition was won by England, who completed a Grand Slam by winning all their five matches.

For the first time, the 2017 tournament used the bonus point system common to most other professional rugby union tournaments. As well as the standard four points for a win and two for a draw, a team scoring four tries in a match received an additional league table point, as did a team losing by seven or fewer points. Additionally, to ensure that a team winning all of its five matches (a Grand Slam) would also win the Championship, three bonus points were awarded for this achievement.

Participants

Table

* England were awarded an extra 3 table points for achieving the Grand Slam.

Fixtures

Round 1

Twenty Welsh players made their debuts.
This was the 8th consecutive victory for Wales and their 13th win against Italy in 13 matches.

Round 2

Round 3

Round 4

Round 5

Broadcasting rights
Some of the matches are  broadcast on television by France 4 and Sky Sports.

See also
 2017 Six Nations Championship

References

External links
 RBS Six Nations Under 20 Championship

2017
2017 rugby union tournaments for national teams
2016–17 in English rugby union
2016–17 in French rugby union
2016–17 in Irish rugby union
2016–17 in Italian rugby union
2016–17 in Scottish rugby union
2016–17 in Welsh rugby union
Under 20
February 2017 sports events in Europe
March 2017 sports events in Europe